The United Front was a political party in Trinidad and Tobago. It received the largest share of the vote (29.4%) in the 1946 general elections (the first held under universal suffrage) and won three of the nine seats. However, the party did not contest any further elections.

References

Defunct political parties in Trinidad and Tobago